Symphyotrichum carnerosanum (formerly Aster carnerosanus) is a species of flowering plant in the family Asteraceae endemic to the Mexican states of Coahuila, Nuevo León, and Tamaulipas.

Citations

References

carnerosanum
Flora of Mexico
Plants described in 1891
Taxa named by Sereno Watson